Bobo Dioulasso Airport  is an international airport in Bobo Dioulasso, Burkina Faso.

The airport has commercial flights to Ouagadougou and to the Ivory Coast.

DFOO is served by a VOR/DME and NDBs and Runway 06 has a Category I ILS. There are also GNSS, VOR and ADF approaches to each runway.

Airlines and destinations

Statistics

References

External links
 Official ASECNA Aeronautical Publication for Burkina Faso 
 
 

Airports in Burkina Faso